Arthur Frets Assa (born 6 January 1984 in Manado, North Sulawesi) is an Indonesian footballer who plays for Gresik United in the Indonesia Super League.

References

External links

Indonesian footballers
Association football defenders
Liga 1 (Indonesia) players
Gresik United players
Indonesian Premier Division players
Deltras F.C. players
Persekabpas Pasuruan players
Persih Tembilahan players
PPSM Magelang players
PS Mojokerto Putra players
People from Manado
1984 births
Living people
Sportspeople from North Sulawesi